In the science fiction of Cordwainer Smith, the Instrumentality of Mankind refers both to Smith's personal future history and universe and to the central government of humanity within that fictional universe. The Instrumentality of Mankind is also the title of a paperback collection of short stories by Cordwainer Smith published in 1979 (now superseded by the later The Rediscovery of Man, which collects all of Smith's short stories).

Origin and history

In the history of Cordwainer Smith's "Instrumentality" universe, the Instrumentality originated as the police force of the Jwindz or "perfect ones" on a post-nuclear holocaust Earth. After attaining power and the expansion of humans in space, they eventually entered a somewhat stagnant phase in which a fixed lifespan of four hundred years was imposed on the human inhabitants of the planets where the Instrumentality directly ruled, all the hard physical labor was done by rightless animal-derived "underpeople", and children were never raised by their biological parents. This somewhat empty and sterile system was reformed and enlivened by the "Rediscovery of Man", the backdrop against which Smith's novel Norstrilia and the majority of his short stories, covering thousands of years of fictional time, are set.  The cycle does not come to a final resolution (there were hints dropped about a mysterious trio of "robot, rat, and Copt" which were not followed up, possibly because of Smith's own death).

Algis Budrys in 1965 praised Smith for creating "a completely consistent phantom universe", in which stories are not sequels to each other but "tesserae in a mosaic". Other authors, he said—including himself—connected stories with a common character or theme; "Not Smith. He's not inventing, he's reporting. And he's doing it from God's point of view", and only the lack of time prevented Smith from portraying all of the "infinite" fictional setting.

Characteristics

Though the Instrumentality does not directly administer every planet, it claims ultimate guardianship over the destiny of the human race. For example, it strictly bans the export of religion from planet to planet. Its members, the Lords and Ladies of the Instrumentality, are collectively all-powerful and often somewhat callously arbitrary. Although their motives are genuinely benign, they act with utmost brutality when survival is at stake.

According to the story "Drunkboat": 
Each was a plenum of the low, the middle, and the high justice. Each could do anything he found necessary or proper to maintain the Instrumentality and keep the peace between the worlds. ... The Instrumentality had the perpetual slogan 'Watch, but do not govern; stop war, but do not wage it; protect, but do not control; and first, survive!'

Individual members

Some prominent Lords and Ladies of the Instrumentality:

Lord Jestocost (the latest of a dynasty of that name), descendant of Lady Goroke
Lady Panc Ashash (as a posthumous personality recording; the eponymous "Dead Lady of Clown Town".)
Lord Femtiosex
Lord Sto Odin
Lord Crudelta
Lady Alice More, partner of the seventh Lord Jestocost.
Lady Arabella Underwood
Lady Johanna Gnade

The names Goroke, Femtiosex, Sto Odin and Panc Ashash are number-word names of the type common during the Instrumentality's decadent period: "five-six" in Japanese is Go-Roku, in Hindi it is Panc-Ashash, and in Swedish Femtiosex (literally "fifty-six").  'Tiga-belas' and 'Veesey-koosey', the names of supporting and main characters of the Instrumentality story Think Blue, Count Two, also mean 'thirteen' (Indonesian or Malay tiga meaning three, and belas being equivalent of English "teen") and 'five-six' (Finnish viisi and kuusi), respectively.  Sto Odin is "a hundred and one" in Russian.  The name Jestocost is based on the word for "cruelty" in Russian (жестокость), and Crudelta is the equivalent in Italian (crudeltà, feminine).  Gnade is a German word meaning "grace" or "mercy".

Cultural references 

The Human Instrumentality Project in the Neon Genesis Evangelion anime series is a reference to Cordwainer's works. A password used in the anime Serial Experiments Lain, "Think Bule Count One Tow" (used by Lain's father) is a misspelled reference to Think Blue, Count Two.

The Dreadstar comic book features the Church of the Instrumentality which is a space empire. The church has created a race of cat-people, similar to the underpeople of the Instrumentality of Mankind.
In the light novel series Log Horizon, the animal-like Werecat, Wolf Fang, and Fox Tail races were created by what was called the Norstrilia Project, in reference to his novel. The anime series Fafner in the Azure is based on concepts of telepathic warfare against an unknown enemy similar to those explored in The Game of Rat and Dragon. Furthermore, the robot piloted by the main character in the first half of the series bears the name Mark Elf, shared by another story set in the Instrumentality fictional universe.

Selected bibliography
 The Rediscovery of Man (short story collection, including all of the Instrumentality of Mankind stories)
 Norstrilia (novel; set relatively late in the chronology of the future history)

References

External links
 On idealism and morality in the Instrumentality of Mankind

Fictional governments
Science fiction book series
Future history
Works by Cordwainer Smith

fr:Les Seigneurs de l'Instrumentalité